Mordellistena postdiscoidalis is a species of beetle in the genus Mordellistena of the family Mordellidae. It was described by Píc in 1937.

References

Beetles described in 1937
postdiscoidalis